Symmetrischema fercularia is a moth in the family Gelechiidae. It was described by Edward Meyrick in 1929. It is found in North America, where it has been recorded Texas.

The wingspan is 10–12 mm. The forewings are dark gray minutely speckled with whitish with an elongate dark fuscous blotch along the costa from one-fourth to two-thirds, edged anteriorly by a rather oblique black streak sometimes preceded by ocherous whitish, and beneath by a black streak to three-fifths, interrupted at the middle, representing or including the discal stigmata, these edged with brownish beneath and the space between them sometimes whitish. There is an obtusely angulated whitish transverse shade at three-fourths more or less indicated. Beyond this is a black dash to the apex, interrupted just before the apex, sometimes edged with brownish beneath. The hindwings are light gray, paler and bluish tinged in the disc.

References

Symmetrischema
Moths described in 1929